The 2021 season was Sri Pahang FC's 18th season in the Malaysian Super League since its inception in 2004.

Management team

Squad

Transfers

Transfers in
Pre-season

Mid-season

Transfers out
Pre-season

Mid-season

Retained

Friendlies

Pre-season
Shah Alam City Cup (19–23 February 2021)

Others

 
During season

Competitions

Malaysia Super League

League table

Matches

Malaysia Cup

Group stage

The draw for the group stage was held on 15 September 2021.

Statistics

Appearances and goals
Players with no appearances not included in the list.

Notes

References 

Sri Pahang FC
Sri Pahang FC seasons
2021 in Malaysian football
Sri Pahang